Help! I'm a Teenage Outlaw is a British television programme filmed in the Czech Republic and first aired on CITV. The show follows three hapless outlaws during the English Civil War, who are trying to bring justice back to the land. The programme is based on the classic children’s  novel, The Children of the New Forest by Frederick Marryat.

Synopsis

The year is 1643, a time of civil war in England and Wales.

In Hampshire, When twelve-year-old Tom York inherits the family business, he discovers that his mother was the wild and daring highwayman Swiftnick - a title which now passes to Tom. But the last thing Tom needs is a dangerous and poorly paid after school job. Having said that, he does look kind of cool in his outlaw mask...

Tom loves the fame and glory that comes with the title Swiftnick. Seeing his pictures on wanted posters is quite a kick. If only it weren't from the dangerous highway stuff, this would be the perfect job for him. Tom's vanity is coupled with an overblown sense of his ability as a highwayman: his vanity and over confidence regularly land him and his gang in trouble. If things get a little to dangerous, Tom isn't above taking a non confrontational approach to hold-ups; he's quite prepared to lie, cheat, charm, trick, scam and beg. And if those ploys don't work he can run fast too!(1)

The Swifnick Gang (Tom, Moses and Deedee) will face different problems and will have to solve them in the most bizarre ways.
They will set out their adventures together...defeating Sir John and robbing coaches.

Cast

Lucinda Dryzek as Lady Devereux/DeeDee

Benjamin Smith as Tom A.K.A. Swiftnick

Eliot Otis Walters as Moses

Brian Hibbard as Sir John

Steve O'Donnell as Captain Watt

Mattew Curtis as Food Tester

George Pearcy as Giles

Characters

Major Characters
Tom - Sorting through the belongings of his dead mother, 12-year-old Tom York discovers that she was the notorious highwaywoman Swiftnick. Though something of a coward, Tom dons a mask and, having decided he looks dashing enough, takes up the mantle to continue the family tradition. He is obnoxious and has a soft spot for Lady Devereux.Tom would do anything to get money and would sometimes end up with a rubbish plan like when he and Moses dressed up as women to get in the castle in the episode "Kidnapped". Tom thinks extremely highly of himself and presents himself as someone who is nearly unbeatable, when he perfectly well knows he is not.

Moses - Tom is joined in his risky venture by his best friend Moses, a precocious ten-year-old who fancies himself as an inventor but whose creations rarely work. He was once Sir John's inventor. At times he is feeble and is useless but can be fiercely loyal to Tom as was displayed in the episode "Pants".

Deedee - Deedee is a tomboy-ish girl who is more courageous, resourceful and capable than the two lads put together. Although, like the others, Deedee masquerades as a peasant, she is actually Lady Devereux, the lady of the local castle. The other two are unaware of this; she hides herself by making up excuses when she gets news from the castle. She has a secret tunnel that can lead out of the village from her wardrobe.

In the episode "Locked In", the three got locked in the crypt and she decided to write about when they all first met, it turned out that she was being robbed but tricked them into giving her their clothes. She decided to be an outlaw when she thought her father who went to war was kidnapped.

In one of the episodes, Lady Devereux falls for a rich lord called Felix. Although criticising Tom's leadership skills at times she prefers to have him lead rather than anyone else as otherwise the gang falls apart as seen in "Pants" and the episode where Bardolph becomes leader of the gang.

Sir John Snakelaw - The Devereux castle has been commandeered by her uncle, the evil Sir John Snakelaw, who imposes crippling taxes on the local populace. Sir John is supported by a motley crew including Captain Watt and a hapless team of guards. He also has a food taster whose ingestion of poison has prematurely aged him so that he looks 50 rather than 20.He hates his mother and would do anything to get money. He also pays a lot of money for the capture of the Swiftnick Gang. He is Lady Devereux's legal guardian.
In one of the episodes he sang Romeo and Juliet to a rich widow named Countess Cornocopia for money but was tricked by Swiftnick.
Sir John is known to have a particularly bad reaction to Shellfish especially prawns, this reaction causes him to fart rudely and often, one such time was in "Love Hurts" in front of Countess Cornocopia. In the Episode "Pants" he discourages Captain Watt ordering shellfish from the caterers once they believe to have captured Swiftnick.

Giles - Sir John's son, the spoilt Giles, has a crush on Lady Devereux but it is strictly one way. He takes lessons in flirting and fencing (although not showing the same aptitude for it as Lady Devereux). He will do anything to gain "Daddy"'s approval. Giles once sabotaged Lord Montague's kart during the village karting race.

Minor Characters
Captain Watt- Sir John's right hand and his personal guard's captain. Watt is very loyal to Sir John and was one of the main characters in the episode "Fools Day", when he told Sir John that an assassin was on his way to kill him for a joke, but Sir John thought it was true and dressed up as a peasant. Despite being loyal to sir John, Watt is actually quite pleasant most of the time and often seems dubious of his masters wisdom. Despite his loyalty even he considers some of Sir John actions despicable such as when he threatens to burn down the village, doesn’t care Giles was kidnapped or tried to sell Lady D’s only portrait of her parents.

Bardolph- The Village Idiot Bardolph was seen in 4 episodes. The first appearance was in "Valentine" in which he is delivered a valentine by Tom. Bardolph confuses it with a brother he never had because of it being addressed to "village idiot", he quickly realises this and exclaims "it must be for me!" and runs away ranting. One was when he became the new leader of the Swiftnick Gang when he saw Tom taking of his mask. He ends up being in the stocks and was going to tell John their real identities when he was stopped by Tom. Bardolph also took part in the village Karting race in one episode of which he won. Bardolph became Sir John's mother's man servant.

Sir John's Mother- Sir John's mother appeared in one episode when she looked for a manservant in secret on a visit to the castle, and almost took Captain Watt but took Bardolph instead.

Food Tester- The Food Tester is Sir John's servant. As his name he tests the food Sir John was supposed to eat and every time there is something poisonous. His real age is 20 but because of how much poison he had consumed looked like 50.

Lord Montague- Lord Montague is Giles's friend and in one episode was almost engaged with Lady Devereux. He also took part in the village karting race in which his kart was sabotaged by Giles and in turn sabotaged Giles' simultaneously.

Felix- The son of one of the most richest widow in the country called Countess Cornacopia. He fancies Lady Devereux, which causes Tom to hate him.
His mother is being courted by Sir John for money purposes only.

Countess Cornocopia- A very rich widow which tempted Sir John to court her. She is the proud mother of Felix Cornocopia.

Episode list

The following is a list of the episodes as they were aired on CITV. The final two episodes of series two were transmitted in the wrong order on CITV. They were switched around and transmitted in the correct order on other channels such as ABC and Nickelodeon.

First series 
 Evicted                                 22 October 2004
 Kidnapped                               29 October 2004
 Betrayed                                5 November 2004
 Fakes                                   12 November 2004
 Thief Taker                             19 November 2004
 Valentine                               26 November 2004

Second series 
 Sheer Torture                           4 January 2005
 Pants                                   11 January 2005
 Locked In                               18 January 2005
 Fools' Gold                             3 January 2006
 Swine Fever                             24 January 2006
 The New Guy                             31 January 2006
 Love Hurts                              7 February 2006

Transmission and Cancellation
The second series was shown in two halves, with the first three episodes being shown back-to-back with series one, making an initial run of 9 episodes. The final four episodes of series two were not transmitted on ITV until January 3, 2006 with episodes 2 and 3 from the first series airing the following two weeks, then afterwards transmitting the final three episodes made. A third series was never ordered due to the closure of ITV’s children's in house production. Since the second series ended, the show has been repeated on a number of channels. It was repeated on the CITV Channel until 2010. In Australia it has been repeated on ABC Kids, ABC2 and it was last repeated on ABC1 between 29 January 2013 – 19 February 2013 at 4:30pm

Sources

External links

2004 British television series debuts
2006 British television series endings
2000s British children's television series
ITV children's television shows
British teen drama television series
English-language television shows
Television series about teenagers